Dewayne Jackson (born November 30, 1990) is an American professional basketball player for Sagesse Club in the Lebanese Basketball League. He played for Homenetmen Club in the 2016-17 season and he averaged 21.1 points per game, 5.6 rebounds, 2.8 assists and 2.5 steals.

Jackson attended Morgan State University in Maryland and played on their men's basketball team from 2009-2013. At Morgan State, Jackson averaged 12.5 points per game over the 128 games in which he appeared.

On August 14, 2018, he signed with Champville SC.

Jackson spent the 2020-21 season with Al Ahly Tripoli and helped lead the team to a league title. On August 28, 2021, he signed in Bahrain with Al-Muharraq.

The Basketball Tournament
DeWayne Jackson played for HBC Sicklerville in the 2018 edition of The Basketball Tournament. He scored 16 points and had 2 steals in the team's first-round loss to the Talladega Knights.

References

External links
eurobasket.com
Morgan State Bears bio

1990 births
Living people
American men's basketball players
American expatriate basketball people in Bulgaria
American expatriate basketball people in Kosovo
American expatriate basketball people in Lebanon
American expatriate basketball people in the United Arab Emirates
Basketball players from Maryland
Basketball players from Washington, D.C.
Forwards (basketball)
Morgan State Bears men's basketball players
People from Bowie, Maryland
Sagesse SC basketball players